Idioblasta isoterma is a moth in the family Crambidae. It was described by Edward Meyrick in 1935. It is found on the Marquesas Archipelago in French Polynesia.

References

Crambinae
Moths described in 1935